Genro is a surname. It mainly occurs in Brazil.

Notable people with this surname include:

 Luciana Genro (born 1971), Brazilian politician
 Tarso Genro (born 1947), Brazilian politician

References